Economic Affairs Committee may refer to:

 Economic Affairs Committee (African Union)
 Economic Affairs Committee (House of Lords) (UK)
 European Parliament Committee on Economic and Monetary Affairs